Luseogliflozin (trade name Lusefi) is a pharmaceutical drug (an SGLT2 inhibitor) used for the treatment of type 2 diabetes mellitus. It was approved for use in Japan in 2014.

References 

SGLT2 inhibitors
Phenol ethers